Anna Elizabeth Dewdney (née Luhrmann; December 25, 1965 – September 3, 2016) was an American author and illustrator of children's books. The first book she wrote and illustrated, Llama Llama Red Pajama, received critical acclaim in 2005. She wrote numerous other books in the Llama Llama series, which have all been New York Times bestsellers. Her work has been adapted into stage plays, dance performances, musicals, and an animated television series for Netflix. Many states and non-profits use her books for literacy campaigns and programs, including the Library of Congress.

Biography
Dewdney spent her early childhood in Englewood, New Jersey, where she attended The Elisabeth Morrow School through the ninth grade. She continued her high school studies at Phillips Academy (Andover) and then transferred to The Putney School, graduating in 1985. She earned a bachelor's degree in Art from Wesleyan University in 1987. Before her work became well known, Dewdney provided for her family of four and their dogs by working as a waitress, a rural postal carrier, and a remedial-language, art, and history teacher at a junior boarding school for dyslexic boys with her partner, Reed Duncan. She and Duncan had two children and lived in Vermont until her death at age 50 from complications of brain cancer.

Career
Dewdney began her career illustrating a variety of books for both children and adults. She gained critical acclaim in 2005 for Llama Llama Red Pajama, the first book she both wrote and illustrated. Her work is known for its emotive content, signature characters, family relationships, and how it addresses the everyday issues of young children. The text of her work is often written in verse; because of this use of rhyming language, and because of Dewdney's reading-advocacy work, her books are often used to promote reading and literacy. The Llama Llama series is highly popular among parents, teachers, and booksellers; in 2011, a Miami, Florida bookseller actually got the Llama Llama character tattooed on her arm for a bookstore event. Dewdney's books have been translated into more than thirteen languages, including: Chinese, Hebrew, Korean, Indonesian, Vietnamese, Polish, Spanish, Russian, Latvian, Romanian, Hungarian, Italian, and German. Partial proceeds from some of her works go toward environmental awareness and conservation efforts, most notably pangolin conservation in southeast Asia. In 2016 it was announced that Reed Duncan had adapted Dewdney's Llama Llama titles as an animated children's television series for Netflix. The show was released by Genius Brands and was initially directed by Rob Minkoff and Saul Andrew Blinkoff.  Jane Startz served as the series producer and Joe Purdy was the series showrunner. Reed Duncan, the show's co-creator, served as executive producer.  Duncan, Startz, and Purdy wrote and created all of the show's main storylines.  Dewdney and Duncan wrote the lyrics to the signature theme song.  The show, starring Jennifer Garner as Mama Llama, contains approximately 50 episodes and is currently in its second season on Netflix. The series has been translated into over 22 different languages and is broadcast in dozens of countries worldwide.

Influences
Dewdney cites Tasha Tudor, the early work of Maurice Sendak, Russell Hoban, Garth Williams, Barbara Cooney, Elizabeth Goudge, Frances Hodgson Burnett, William Steig, E. B. White, Munro Leaf, and Robert Lawson as creative influences.

Awards and honors
Dewdney's Llama Llama books have all been New York Times bestsellers, and several titles have reached #1 on the list. Her books regularly make the Publishers Weekly and IndieBooks bestsellers lists and have hit buzzworthy sales figures. Llama Llama Red Pajama was chosen as Jumpstart's Read for the Record book in 2011, setting the world's record for most readings of a particular book on one day. This event was recorded on the Today show on October 6, 2011, where her work was read live to the national television audience. Her work has been adapted into stage plays, dance performances, and musicals, most notably by Dolly Parton at Dollywood.<ref>"Dollywood Penguin Players Bring Kids’ Book to Life"</ref</ref> The Dolly Parton Foundation has also chosen her Llama Llama series for The Imagination Library, a not-for-profit organization serving young children through book donations. Many states and not-for-profit organizations use her books for literacy campaigns and programs, including the Library of Congress, which featured her work and a live reading by Anna at its 2012 National Book Festival. Dewdney's work is highly acclaimed by critics and is often recommended on booklists by national reviewers.

Other awards
Llama Llama Red Pajama: Scholastic Parent and Child "100 Greatest Books for Kids" award winner; Bank Street "Best Children’s Book" recipient; Missouri Building Block Award winner; National Public Radio pick; Carolina Children's Book Award Master List winner (picture book category)
Llama Llama Home With Mama: Children's Choice Book Award "Illustrator of the Year" nominee (2012)
Llama Llama Time to Share: Children's Choice book Award "Illustrator of the Year" nominee (2013); Thriving Family magazine's Best Family-Friendly Picture Book finalist (2012)
Llama Llama Mad at Mama: Missouri Building Block Award winner; winner of Alabama's Emphasis on Reading program (grades K-1); Book Sense Book of the Year Children's Illustrated Honor Book (2008)

Selected works
 What You Do Is Easy, What I Do Is Hard (her first picture book - illustrator only, written by Jake Wolf)
Grumpy Gloria
Llama Llama Hoppity-Hop
Llama Llama and the Bully Goat
Llama Llama Holiday Drama
Llama Llama Home With Mama
Llama Llama Mad at Mama
Llama Llama Misses Mama
Llama Llama Nighty-Night
Llama Llama Red Pajama
Llama Llama Time To Share
Llama Llama Gram and Grandpa
Llama Llama Zippity-Zoom
Llama Llama Wakey-Wake
Llama Llama Sand & Sun
Llama Llama Easter Egg
Llama Llama I Love You
Llama Llama Jingle Bells
Llama Llama Trick or Treat
Nelly Gnu and Daddy Too
Nobunny’s Perfect
Roly Poly Pangolin
Llama Llama Birthday Party!
Little Excavator (Posthumous, June 6, 2017)
Llama Llama Gives Thanks (Posthumous, August 15, 2017)
Llama Llama Television Show (Posthumous, January 26, 2018)
Llama Llama Loves to Read
Llama Llama Mess, Mess, Mess
Llama Llama Loose Tooth Drama (forthcoming)
Everything Will Be OK (forthcoming)
Animalicious
Llama Llama Yum, Yum, Yum
Llama Llama Hide & Seek
Llama Llama 5-Minute Stories
Llama Llama Mad Libs Junior
Llama Llama & Me: My Book of Memories
What’s Your Favorite Color? (one of several contributors for the Eric Carle collection)
Christmas in the Barn (illustration for the Margaret Wise Brown work)

References

External links 

  (No longer active, splashpage only redirecting visitors to Llama Llama site)
 Llama Llama website
Twitter: AnnaDewdney
Instagram: LlamaLlamaOfficial 

1965 births
2016 deaths
American children's writers
The Putney School alumni
Wesleyan University alumni
American women illustrators
21st-century American women writers
American women children's writers
American children's book illustrators
Deaths from brain cancer in the United States
People from Englewood, New Jersey
Writers from New York City